Randol Township is one of ten townships in Cape Girardeau County, Missouri, USA.  As of the 2000 census, its population was 4,030.

History
Randol Township was founded in 1872. The township derives its name from Enos Randal, a pioneer citizen.

Geography
It contains two unincorporated settlements: Oriole, and Egypt Mills; and ten cemeteries: Ervin, Heuer, Iona, Lange, McKendree, Minton, Noland, Thompson, Vangilder and Zierath.

The streams of Juden Creek, Bainbridge Creek, Little Flora Creek and Soakie Creek run through this township.

References

 USGS Geographic Names Information System (GNIS)

External links
 US-Counties.com
 City-Data.com

Townships in Cape Girardeau County, Missouri
Cape Girardeau–Jackson metropolitan area
Townships in Missouri